Sean James McManus (born February 16, 1955) is the chairman of CBS Sports and was the president of both CBS Sports and CBS News from 2005 to 2011.

Education and early career

McManus graduated from Fairfield College Preparatory School, a private Jesuit high school in Fairfield, Connecticut, and Duke University.

In 1977, McManus began working as a production assistant and associate producer at ABC Sports. In 1979, he moved to NBC Sports and in 1982, aged 27, he became its vice-president of program development. Here he first became involved in rights negotiations, for sports such as the Olympic Games, football, tennis, basketball, horse racing and auto racing.

In 1987, he became a senior vice president of American TV sales and programming for Trans World International, the television division of sports marketing firm International Management Group.

Career at CBS

McManus was named president, CBS Sports, in November 1996. Here, he continued to be active in negotiating broadcast rights deals for major American sports, such as the National Football League, the NCAA, the  PGA Tour and Southeastern Conference (SEC) football and basketball. He also oversaw a logo redesign for CBS Sports, and rebranded CSTV's cable and digital businesses as CBS College Sports Network in 2008, and as CBS Sports Network in 2011. He co-launched the digital network CBS Sports HQ in 2018, and supervised several Super Bowl broadcasts, including Super Bowl XLVII, Super Bowl LIII, and Super Bowl 50.

McManus was named president, CBS News, in October 2005, and continued to serve concurrently as president of sports. As president of news, he oversaw building of a new newsroom and control room in New York and created the series CBS Reports: Children of the Recession.

He is executive producer of Inside the NFL on Showtime.

Awards

McManus has won 15 Emmy Awards and the Cynopsis Sports Media Legacy Award. He was inducted into the Broadcasting & Cable Hall of Fame in 2010 and the Sports Broadcasting Hall of Fame in 2016.

Personal life and family

McManus is the son of sportscaster Jim McKay (Jim McKay's legal surname was McManus). He lives in Connecticut with his wife and children.

References

External links
CBS biography of Sean McManus

1955 births
Living people
People from Fairfield, Connecticut
American television executives
Duke University alumni
Paramount Global people
CBS executives
Presidents of CBS Sports
Presidents of CBS News
20th-century American businesspeople
Fairfield College Preparatory School alumni